The Honeypot is a 1920 British silent romance film directed by Fred LeRoy Granville and starring Peggy Hyland, Campbell Gullan and James Lindsay. It was made at Isleworth Studios. A sequel Love Maggy was released the following year.

Cast
 Peggy Hyland as Maggie Delamere  
 Campbell Gullan as Lord Chalfont  
 James Lindsay as Fred Woolff 
 Lillian Hall-Davis as Alexandra Hersey  
 Alfred Drayton as De Preyne  
 Maidie Hope as Lady Susan  
 Grace Lane as Mrs. Lambert 
 Lillian La Verne as Mrs. Bell

References

Bibliography
 Low, Rachael. The History of the British Film 1918-1929. George Allen & Unwin, 1971.

External links
 

1920 films
1920s romance films
British romance films
British silent feature films
Films directed by Fred LeRoy Granville
Films shot at Isleworth Studios
British black-and-white films
1920s English-language films
1920s British films